The men's triple jump event at the 2021 European Athletics U23 Championships was held in Tallinn, Estonia, at Kadriorg Stadium on 10 and 11 July.

Records
Prior to the competition, the records were as follows:

Results

Qualification
Qualification rule: 16.30 (Q) or the 12 best results (q) qualified for the final.

Final

References

Triple jump
Triple jump at the European Athletics U23 Championships